Ilya Vasilyevich Shmelyov (— 25 December 1979) was a Soviet fighter pilot during World War II. Awarded the title Hero of the Soviet Union on 23 August 1943 for his initial victories, by the end of the war his tally stood at an estimated 27 solo and 10 shared shootdowns, although more conservative estimates put the figure at 26 solo and one shared.

References 

1917 births
1979 deaths
Soviet World War II flying aces
Heroes of the Soviet Union
Recipients of the Order of Lenin
Recipients of the Order of the Red Banner
Recipients of the Order of Alexander Nevsky
Recipients of the Order of the Red Star